Hyllisia albocincta is a species of beetle in the family Cerambycidae. It was described by Maurice Pic in 1924.

References

albocincta
Beetles described in 1924
Taxa named by Maurice Pic